Israel was present at the 1987 Eurovision Song Contest, which was held at the Palais du Centenaire in Brussels, Belgium. Their entry was "Shir Habatlanim", written and composed by Zohar Laskov and performed by actor-comedians Natan Datner and Avi Kushnir, who dubbed themselves the Lazy Bums. The song was selected through Israel's traditional national final, the Kdam Eurovision.

Before Eurovision

Kdam Eurovision 1987 

The 1987 edition of the Kdam Eurovision was the largest edition of the contest up to that point. Sixteen songs were in contention to represent Israel in Belgium, and rather than only use the votes of regional jury panels as was standard procedure, five of them were joined by three televoting regions and a vote of the audience watching the show in the auditorium. Said auditorium was the Cinerama in Tel Aviv, which marked the first time that the Israeli selection took place outside of Jerusalem. The final was held on 1 April 1987, with co-hosts Yardena Arazi (a former Eurovision co-host and contestant in her own right, whom the IBA would select as their international representative again the following year) and presenter Yoram Arbel. For the first time since the 1979 heats, an orchestra was present, with each composition's respective arranger leading the orchestra. However, according to Kobi Oshrat (the conductor and arranger behind several entries that year, including the eventual winner), all the music had been pre-recorded, and the musicians in the pit were miming, as the IBA did not have the budget for effective sound quality.

Among the competitors was Izhar Cohen, who had previously scored Israel's first Eurovision victory with the song "A-Ba-Ni-Bi" in 1978 and later earned them a fifth-place finish in 1985 with "Ole, Ole." He was joined here by his sister, fellow singer Vardina Cohen. Also making an early appearance were Moshe and Orna Datz, better known as Duo Datz, who would go on to win the 1991 Israeli heats and finish third in Rome with the song "Kan." Also competing, as he had in several prior selections, was Svika Pick, who would later write "Diva" with Yoav Ginai and help Dana International secure Israel's third Eurovision win eleven years later.

The voting was close, with few points separating the top four songs. However, to great surprise, it was Datner and Kushnir's novelty song "Shir Habatlanim", an ode to the virtues of an easygoing life sung by the duo in Blues Brothers-inspired outfits, that took the lead by thirteen points over frequent national finalist Ilana Avital and earned the right to fly the Israeli flag in Brussels. As one of many apocryphal stories regarding Israel's Eurovision history goes, the Minister of Culture (later clarified to be Yitzhak Navon) threatened to resign if the duo remained the Israeli representatives. They did, and he did not.

At Eurovision
"Shir Habatlanim" was written and composed by theatre and film production manager Zohar Laskov. He was not, to say the least, an experienced songwriter, and called on his friend, the aforementioned Kobi Oshrat, to help him polish up the song for the Kdam. Oshrat was stupefied with the initial demo and informed both him and Datner and Kushnir's manager that he would be unable to work on it. The duo themselves implored him to stay, and eventually he found his moment of inspiration watching the 1980 film The Blues Brothers on television. He decided to restructure the song around the tempo of the Blues Brothers' signature song, "Everybody Needs Somebody to Love" (originally by Solomon Burke), and moreover told Datner and Kushnir's director, Micha Levinson, to base their look and dance moves on those of the Blues Brothers. These canny decisions made the duo stand out in Brussels, where they drew crowds looking to imitate their signature finger-twirling dance move. The Blues Brothers comparison was also made by British commentator Terry Wogan, who dubbed "Shir Habatlanim", perhaps flippantly, "a simple song of love" following their performance. Oshrat, who led the orchestra, made a show of putting on a pair of sunglasses (like those worn by the Bums) before counting the musicians in.

Israel performed second on the night of the contest, following Norway and preceding Austria. The lively performance brought Israel an eighth-place finish with 73 points, with the highest scores coming from France and Portugal, who each awarded the song ten points. It came as a pleasant surprise, as Israel was rebounding from their worst finish up to that point the year before (second-to-last with seven points, which would remain Israel's worst result until 1993). Rather than confound their misfortune, Datner and Kushnir became Israel's unexpected savants. Keeping in the festive spirit, Israel's jury awarded twelve points to Sweden's Lotta Engberg and her Calypso-inflected song "Boogaloo".

Voting

References

1987
Countries in the Eurovision Song Contest 1987
Eurovision